Hamish John Hamilton Marshall (born 15 February 1979) is a former New Zealand cricketer, who played all formats of the game for New Zealand. He is the identical twin brother of James Marshall. Hamish and James became the second pair of twins (after Mark and Steve Waugh) to play Test cricket, and are the first identical pair.

Marshall, a middle-order batsman, made his Test debut against South Africa in December 2000. Batting at No. 7, he made an unbeaten 40. Marshall has also played for Northland in the Hawke Cup.

Domestic career

Indian Cricket League
He played for the Royal Bengal Tigers in the Indian Cricket League until the ICL collapsed in mid-2009. In February 2009, Indian cricketers Sachin Tendulkar and Dinesh Karthik had to withdraw from playing in a friendly T20 cricket match between Australian Cricketers' Association and New Zealand Cricket Players Association, because of Marshall's involvement in the match. Due to the rivalry between the IPL and the ICL, the BCCI asked Tendulkar and Karthik not to play in the match. The BCCI cited the involvement of Marshall in one of the teams for not fielding its cricketers.

Ireland career 

In October 2010, it was announced that Marshall would tour India with the Ireland cricket team. It was hoped that it would assist his integration into the team in the event the ICC allowed him to play for Ireland in ODIs.

Gloucestershire career 
Marshall arrived at Gloucestershire County Cricket Club in 2006 and has played every season since. In 2015 he was awarded a benefit season.

In 2011, Both Hamish Marshall and Kevin O'Brien became the first pair of batsmen to score centuries in a single T20, when they did it for Gloucestershire

In June 2012, Marshall was appointed as Gloucestershire County Cricket Club's captain for their Twenty20 campaign.

In the 2013 County Season, Marshall passed 1000 County Championship runs for the first time since 2006, averaging 50.35. He was rewarded with a new three-year contract taking him to 37 years of age.

Wellington 
In 2016, Marshall returned to New Zealand to play cricket for Wellington at 37 years of age. he was also planning to work selling insurance.

International career 

He waited another three years until he was called up for the one-day series in Pakistan in 2003-04. In his third game, he scored 101 not out at Faisalabad. In the corresponding home series he scored 64 and 84 to help New Zealand win the series. He helped New Zealand to win the 2003-04 home one-day series against South Africa, and was called up for the 2004 NatWest Series in England. He scored 75 not out and 55 in the group matches, before contributing 44 as New Zealand won the final against West Indies.

He scored his first Test century in March 2005 against Australia with an innings of 146. He then scored 160 against Sri Lanka in April.

Marshall was a late call-up for the 2007 Cricket World Cup, in which he scored one half-century. After the tournament, he chose to reject a contract with New Zealand in order to play for Gloucestershire, due to his Irish passport Marshall does not count as an overseas player so long as he does not play for New Zealand.

Career best performances
as of 13 January 2019

References

External links
 
 

1979 births
Living people
New Zealand One Day International cricketers
New Zealand Test cricketers
New Zealand Twenty20 International cricketers
New Zealand cricketers
Northern Districts cricketers
Wellington cricketers
Gloucestershire cricketers
Buckinghamshire cricketers
Twin sportspeople
Identical twins
New Zealand twins
Gloucestershire cricket captains
Marylebone Cricket Club cricketers
People from Warkworth, New Zealand
North Island cricketers
People educated at Mahurangi College